Plain weave (also called tabby weave, linen weave or taffeta weave) is the most basic of three fundamental types of textile weaves (along with satin weave and twill). It is strong and hard-wearing, and is used for fashion and furnishing fabrics.

In plain weave cloth, the warp and weft threads cross at right angles, aligned so they form a simple criss-cross pattern. Each weft thread crosses the warp threads by going over one, then under the next, and so on. The next weft thread goes under the warp threads that its neighbor went over, and vice versa. 
 
 Balanced plain weaves are fabrics in which the warp and weft are made of threads of the same weight (size) and the same number of ends per inch as picks per inch.
 Basketweave is a variation of plain weave in which two or more threads are bundled and then woven as one in the warp or weft, or both.

A balanced plain weave can be identified by its checkerboard-like appearance. It is also known as one-up-one-down weave or over and under pattern.

Examples of fabric with plain weave are chiffon, organza, percale and taffeta.

Etymology 
According to the 12th-century geographer al-Idrīsī, the city of Almería in Andalusia manufactured imitations of Iraqi and Persian silks called ‘attābī, which David Jacoby identifies as "a taffeta fabric made of silk and cotton (natural fibers) originally produced in Attabiya, a district of Baghdad." The word was adopted into Medieval Latin as attabi, then French as tabis and English as tabby, as in "tabby weave".

End uses 
Its uses range from heavy and coarse canvas and blankets made of thick yarns to the lightest and finest cambries and muslins made in extremely fine yarns. Chiffon, organza, percale and taffeta are also plain weave fabrics.

References

Citations

Bibliography

External links
 

Weaves
Woven fabrics